Lyons is a northern suburb of the city of Darwin, Northern Territory, Australia.

Present day
Prior to gazettal on 7 July 2004, the area comprising Lyons was part of the suburb of Lee Point, Northern Territory. Lyons is a new suburb with new estates being built to the west.

History
Lyons is named in commemoration of Tommy Imabulg Lyons, a traditional owner (Greater Darwin Area) and senior man for the Danggalaba clan of the Larrakia people, who was a member of the "Black Watch" and worked as a police tracker. Tommy lived most of his life on the Cox Peninsula, Dum in Mirrie and Indian Islands in Bynoe Harbour. He died in 1978.

References

External links

Suburbs of Darwin, Northern Territory
History of the Northern Territory